Damir Desnica (born 20 December 1956) is a Croatian retired footballer who played as a forward.

Club career
Born in Obrovac, Croatia, Socialist Federal Republic of Yugoslavia, Desnica spent much of his career with HNK Rijeka, appearing in nearly 300 official games and winning two Yugoslav Cups in the process. In 1985, aged nearly 29, he moved abroad and signed for Belgium's K.V. Kortrijk.

Desnica returned to his country after five years, and joined NK Zadar. After a brief spell with NK Orijent, he signed with NK Pazinka, and retired at 41 after representing, in both Rijeka and its outskirts, lowly clubs NK Halubjan, NK Klana and NK Lučki Radnik.

International career
Desnica earned one cap for Yugoslavia, scoring in a 2–3 away loss against Romania for the UEFA Euro 1980 qualifiers, on 25 October 1978.

Personal life
Desnica was one of the very few deaf persons to play football professionally – he also only communicated manually. On 7 November 1984, in a match against Real Madrid at the Santiago Bernabéu Stadium for the season's UEFA Cup, he was sent off for two bookable offences by referee Roger Schoeters, the second for allegedly protesting; Rijeka finished the match with eight players and lost the tie 3–4 on aggregate.

Club statistics

Honours
Rijeka
Yugoslav Cup: 1977–78, 1978–79
Balkans Cup: 1978

Zadar
Yugoslav Inter-Republic League (West): 1990–91

Pazinka
Croatian Second Football League (West): 1992

References

External links

1956 births
Living people
Footballers from Rijeka
Association football forwards
Yugoslav footballers
Yugoslavia international footballers
Croatian footballers
HNK Rijeka players
K.V. Kortrijk players
NK Zadar players
HNK Orijent players
NK Pazinka players
Yugoslav First League players
Belgian Pro League players
Croatian Football League players
First Football League (Croatia) players
Yugoslav expatriate footballers
Expatriate footballers in Belgium
Yugoslav expatriate sportspeople in Belgium
Deaf association football players
Croatian deaf people